The following Federal Agencies are headquartered in Northern Virginia. Agencies with approximately 10,000+ employees, or a $10 billion+ budget are in bold.

See also
 List of federal installations in Maryland
 List of companies headquartered in Northern Virginia
 List of space companies and facilities in Virginia

References
 Top Secret America: Government Organizations 

Federal agencies in Northern Virginia
Northern Virginia
Virginia
federal agencies